Kuzminka is a rural locality (a settlement) in Dinamovskoye Rural Settlement, Nekhayevsky District, Volgograd Oblast, Russia. The population was 3 as of 2010.

Geography 
Kuzminka is located on Kalach Upland, 26 km southwest of Nekhayevskaya (the district's administrative centre) by road. Dinamo is the nearest rural locality.

References 

Rural localities in Nekhayevsky District